Norman Pryde also known as Norrie Pryde is a retired Scottish international lawn bowler.

Bowls career
He won a silver medal in the fours at the 1970 British Commonwealth Games in Edinburgh with Alex McIntosh, David Pearson and John Slight.

He also won the Scottish National Bowls Championships fours title (with McIntosh, Pearson and Slight) in 1968 and the pairs title with McIntosh in 1973.

References

Living people
Scottish male bowls players
Commonwealth Games silver medallists for Scotland
Commonwealth Games medallists in lawn bowls
Bowls players at the 1970 British Commonwealth Games
Year of birth missing (living people)
Medallists at the 1970 British Commonwealth Games